Gelan Daraq-e Sofla (also Romanized as Gelan Daraq-e Soflá; also known as Kolandaraq-e Pā’īn and Kūlān Daraq-e Pā’īn) is a village in Gerdeh Rural District, in the Central District of Namin County, Ardabil Province, Iran. At the 2006 census, its population was 74, in 17 families.

References 

Towns and villages in Namin County